Dave Moore may refer to:
 Dave Moore (newscaster) (1924–1998), American newscaster on Minnesota television
 Dave Moore (American football) (born 1969), American long snapper/tight end for the Tampa Bay Buccaneers
 Dave Moore (motorsport commentator) (born 1966), television motorsport commentator
 Dave Moore (footballer) (born 1959), English former footballer, football manager and physiotherapist
 Dave Moore (singer-songwriter) (born 1951), American singer, songwriter and instrumentalist based in Iowa

See also
David Moore (disambiguation)
Davey Moore (disambiguation)